"Jizz in My Pants" is a SNL Digital Short which aired on Saturday Night Live on December 6, 2008, and YouTube on the same day. It serves as the music video for the first single from the Lonely Island's debut album, Incredibad. The video stars the Lonely Island members Andy Samberg, Jorma Taccone and, briefly, Akiva Schaffer, and also features guest appearances by Justin Timberlake (who had also appeared in "Dick in a Box"), Molly Sims and Jamie-Lynn Sigler.

Music video 

The singing is done in soft British Received Pronunciation-style accents in the style of the Pet Shop Boys and their song "West End Girls", with Samberg additionally comparing the beat to the works of producer Timbaland. The video opens with Samberg in a night club singing as he is about to hit on a girl (Molly Sims). They head to her apartment, share a kiss in the hallway outside her door, but once she says that "she wants some more" (i.e. sex),  he "jizzes" prematurely. He refuses to apologize, saying it would be "absurd" and blames the girl for overstimulating him by rubbing his "butt", before he goes home "and change[s]". Taccone is then shown in a grocery store (where Justin Timberlake makes a cameo appearance as a janitor) conversing with a check-out girl (Jamie-Lynn Sigler), but jizzes in his pants as well when she asks, "cash or credit?" After explaining that the way she bags cans got him "bothered and hot", he tells her that he will pay by check.

Samberg then exits a movie theater when the discovery of a missed cellphone call from the girl he met at the club causes him to prematurely ejaculate again. In another scene, Taccone is seen driving a Mercedes-Benz while listening to the radio, when a song begins to play that reminds him of the check-out girl, causing him to "jizz" in his pants yet again. Samberg and Taccone then sing about how easily they "jizz in [their] pants" from stimuli such as an alarm clock, opening a window, the twist ending of The Sixth Sense, and simply eating a grape. They explain that merely being adjacent to women causes them to ejaculate, which, they lament, necessitates the constant wearing of condoms under their underpants. Akiva Schaffer can be seen in the background at various times as the disc jockey.

Background 

"Jizz in My Pants" was written by the Lonely Island during the summer of 2008. The comedy troupe rented a house in Los Angeles and created a makeshift studio where they would record songs. The music video was filmed in early September 2008, the week before the 34th season of Saturday Night Live premiered. The Lonely Island did not originally intend for it to actually be aired on the show, but the positive reactions by fellow cast and crew members persuaded them to change their minds.

Reception

Critical 

A number of commentators enjoyed "Jizz in My Pants". Jennifer Maerz of SF Weekly felt the video was "funny in a totally moronic way", describing it as "pure electro-trash" with "douchebag clothes, attitudes, and beats".  Mickey O'Connor of TV Guide liked the song's "clever lyrics" which "brilliantly satirize the pompous chill of '90s synth rock.'" The New York Observer writer Christopher Rosen described the video as "awesomely catchy", in contrast to the rest of the SNL episode, which he felt was not very good.

"Jizz in My Pants" reception was not all positive, however. Jerry Portwood of New York Press compared the video unfavorably to the work of "Weird Al" Yankovic. The video did not satisfy him "beyond a few chuckles." Portwood preferred Yankovic's ability to parody current events and pop culture, dissecting "what was actually manipulative and mind-numbing about popular music and the market as a whole". He wrote that Samberg, in contrast, sticks to "safe and, ultimately, ineffective parody."

Commercial 

The track sold 76,000 downloads in its first two weeks of availability. The song has gone Gold in Australia with sales in excess of 35,000.

The video was published first on YouTube along with most of Lonely Island's works. , "Jizz in My Pants" has been watched over 263 million times, making it Lonely Island's second-most popular video ever, after "I Just Had Sex". The video was actually uploaded to The Lonely Island's official YouTube channel twice, although it is unclear why, as the HD version was uploaded first. The HD version has 174 million views, while the SD version has about 89 million views.

Charts

Certifications

Year-end charts

References

External links 

 
 

2008 singles
Music videos
Saturday Night Live sketches
Saturday Night Live in the 2000s
The Lonely Island songs
Dirty rap songs
2008 songs
Universal Republic Records singles
Comedy rap songs
2008 YouTube videos
Internet memes introduced in 2008